The Washington D.C. Area Film Critics Association Award for Best Ensemble is one of the annual awards given by the Washington D.C. Area Film Critics Association.

Winners

2000s

2010s

2020s

See also
Independent Spirit Robert Altman Award
Screen Actors Guild Award for Outstanding Performance by a Cast in a Motion Picture

References

Film awards for Best Cast
Ensemble, Best